Rupert Butler was born in 1933. He is the son of Lt.-Col. Patrick Richard Butler and Rhona Curzon (the daughter of Assheton Nathaniel Curzon).

Career
He is an authority on Soviet and Nazi police, secret police and special forces during the 1930s and the Second World War.

His many books include Gestapo: The Truth Behind the Evil Legend, which has been translated into Spanish, Portuguese, Polish, Russian, German, and Danish.   
Among his other books are The Black Angels: A History of the Waffen SS, Legions of Death: The Nazi Enslavement of Eastern Europe, and SS-Leibstandarte Adolf Hitler: The History of the First SS Division 1933-45.   Legions of Death is frequently employed by Holocaust deniers to support claims that the various confessions of Rudolph Hoess were obtained through torture.

His most recent books are on Russia:  "Stalin's Instruments of Terror", an illustrated account of the life of the Soviet dictator was published in 2006, and "Stalin's Secret War" (2010).

Butler currently lives in London.

References 

1933 births
Living people
British essayists